Xian of Jin may refer to:

Marquis Xian of Jin (died 812 BC)
Duke Xian of Jin (died 651 BC)